The following outline is provided as an overview of and topical guide to Mauritius:

In addition to the Island of Mauritius, the republic includes the islands of St. Brandon, Rodrigues and the Agaléga Islands. Mauritius is part of the Mascarene Islands, with the French island of Réunion 200 km (125 mi) to the southwest and the island of Rodrigues 570 km to the northeast.

General reference 

 Pronunciation: 
 English:  or 
 French:  or 
 Common English country name: Mauritius
 Official English country name: The Republic of Mauritius
 Official endonym (s): Mauritius (English), Maurice (French)
 Common endonym (s): Île Maurice (French), Moris (Mauritian Creole), मॉरिशस (Hindi)  
 Adjectival(s): Mauritian
 Demonym(s): Mauritian 
 Etymology: Maurice, Prince of Orange
 International rankings of Mauritius
 ISO country codes: MU, MUS, 480
 ISO region codes: See ISO 3166-2:MU
 Internet country code top-level domain: .mu

Geography of Mauritius 

 Mauritius is: an island country
 Location:
 Eastern Hemisphere and Southern Hemisphere
 Africa (off its east coast, east of Madagascar)
 East Africa
 Southern Africa
 Indian Ocean
 Time zone:  Mauritius Time (UTC+04)
 Extreme points of Mauritius
 High:  Piton de la Petite Rivière Noire 
 Low:  Indian Ocean 0 m
 Land boundaries:  none
 Coastline:  Indian Ocean 177 km
 Population of Mauritius: 1,262,000  – 151st most populous country

 Area of Mauritius: 2,040 km2
 Atlas of Mauritius

Environment of Mauritius 

 Climate of Mauritius
 Protected areas of Mauritius
 National parks of Mauritius
 Wildlife of Mauritius
 Fauna of Mauritius
 Birds of Mauritius
 Mammals of Mauritius

Natural geographic features of Mauritius 

 Glaciers in Mauritius: none
 Rivers of Mauritius
 World Heritage Sites in Mauritius
 Aapravasi Ghat
 Le Morne Brabant

Regions of Mauritius 

Regions of Mauritius

Ecoregions of Mauritius 

List of ecoregions in Mauritius

Administrative divisions of Mauritius

Districts of Mauritius 
 Black River
 Flacq
 Grand Port
 Moka
 Pamplemousses
 Plaines Wilhems
 Port Louis
 Rivière du Rempart
 Savanne

Towns of Mauritius 
 Beau-Bassin Rose-Hill
 Curepipe
 Port Louis: Capital of Mauritius
 Quatre Bornes
 Vacoas-Phoenix

Demography of Mauritius 

Demographics of Mauritius

Government and politics of Mauritius 

Politics of Mauritius
 Form of government:
 Capital of Mauritius: Port Louis
 Elections in Mauritius
 Political parties in Mauritius

Branches of the government of Mauritius 

Government of Mauritius

Executive branch of the government of Mauritius 
 Head of state: President of Mauritius,
 Head of government: Prime Minister of Mauritius,
 Vice Prime Minister of Mauritius
 Cabinet of Mauritius

Legislative branch of the government of Mauritius 

 Parliament of Mauritius (unicameral)

Judicial branch of the government of Mauritius 

Court system of Mauritius
 Supreme Court of Mauritius

Foreign relations of Mauritius 

Foreign relations of Mauritius
 Diplomatic missions in Mauritius
 Diplomatic missions of Mauritius

International organization membership 
The Republic of Mauritius is a member of:

African, Caribbean, and Pacific Group of States (ACP)
African Development Bank Group (AfDB)
African Union (AU)
Common Market for Eastern and Southern Africa (COMESA)
Commonwealth of Nations
Comunidade dos Países de Língua Portuguesa (CPLP) (associate)
Food and Agriculture Organization (FAO)
Group of 77 (G77)
Indian Ocean Commission (InOC)
International Atomic Energy Agency (IAEA)
International Bank for Reconstruction and Development (IBRD)
International Civil Aviation Organization (ICAO)
International Criminal Court (ICCt)
International Criminal Police Organization (Interpol)
International Development Association (IDA)
International Federation of Red Cross and Red Crescent Societies (IFRCS)
International Finance Corporation (IFC)
International Fund for Agricultural Development (IFAD)
International Hydrographic Organization (IHO)
International Labour Organization (ILO)
International Maritime Organization (IMO)
International Mobile Satellite Organization (IMSO)
International Monetary Fund (IMF)
International Olympic Committee (IOC)
International Organization for Migration (IOM)
International Organization for Standardization (ISO)

International Red Cross and Red Crescent Movement (ICRM)
International Telecommunication Union (ITU)
International Telecommunications Satellite Organization (ITSO)
International Trade Union Confederation (ITUC)
Inter-Parliamentary Union (IPU)
Multilateral Investment Guarantee Agency (MIGA)
Nonaligned Movement (NAM)
Organisation internationale de la Francophonie (OIF)
Organisation for the Prohibition of Chemical Weapons (OPCW)
Permanent Court of Arbitration (PCA)
South Asian Association for Regional Cooperation (SAARC) (observer)
Southern African Development Community (SADC)
United Nations (UN)
United Nations Conference on Trade and Development (UNCTAD)
United Nations Educational, Scientific, and Cultural Organization (UNESCO)
United Nations Industrial Development Organization (UNIDO)
Universal Postal Union (UPU)
World Confederation of Labour (WCL)
World Customs Organization (WCO)
World Federation of Trade Unions (WFTU)
World Health Organization (WHO)
World Intellectual Property Organization (WIPO)
World Meteorological Organization (WMO)
World Tourism Organization (UNWTO)
World Trade Organization (WTO)

Law and order in Mauritius 

Law of Mauritius
 Constitution of Mauritius
 Crime in Mauritius
 Human rights in Mauritius
 LGBT rights in Mauritius
 Law enforcement in Mauritius
 Mauritius Police Force

Military of Mauritius 

Military of Mauritius
 Command
 Commander-in-chief:
 Forces
 Army of Mauritius

Local government in Mauritius 

Local government in Mauritius

History of Mauritius 

History of Mauritius
Current events of Mauritius

Culture of Mauritius 

Culture of Mauritius
 Cuisine of Mauritius
 Languages of Mauritius
 Media of Mauritius
 National symbols of Mauritius
 Coat of arms of Mauritius
 Flag of Mauritius
 National anthem of Mauritius
 Newspapers in Mauritius
 L'Express
 Le Mauricien
 Prostitution in Mauritius
 Public holidays in Mauritius
 Religion in Mauritius
 Christianity in Mauritius
 Hinduism in Mauritius
 Islam in Mauritius
 Judaism in Mauritius
 World Heritage Sites in Mauritius

Art in Mauritius 
  Since 2009 there is an Opera Festival in Mauritius
Opera Mauritius and The Friends,
 Literature of Mauritius
 Music of Mauritius

Sports in Mauritius 

Sports in Mauritius
 Football in Mauritius
 Mauritius at the Olympics

Economy and infrastructure of Mauritius 

Economy of Mauritius
 Economic rank, by nominal GDP (2007): 130th (one hundred and thirtieth)
 Communications in Mauritius
 Internet in Mauritius
 Companies of Mauritius
Currency of Mauritius: Rupee
ISO 4217: MUR
 Health care in Mauritius
 Mining in Mauritius
 Mauritius Stock Exchange
Sugar industry of Mauritius
 Tourism in Mauritius
Mauritius Tourism Promotion Authority
 Visa policy of Mauritius
 Transport in Mauritius
 Airports in Mauritius
 Rail transport in Mauritius

Education in Mauritius 

Education in Mauritius

See also 

Mauritius
 
List of international rankings
List of Mauritius-related topics
Member state of the Commonwealth of Nations
Member state of the United Nations
Outline of Africa

References

External links 

 Government of Mauritius
 
 
 

Mauritius